The Southport School (TSS) is an independent Anglican early learning, primary and secondary day and boarding school for boys, located in Southport, a suburb on the Gold Coast of Queensland, Australia.

Established in 1901 by the Revd Horace Henry Dixon, TSS is the oldest Anglican boys' boarding school in Queensland and the only all-boys boarding school on the Gold Coast. The school has a non-selective enrolment policy and currently caters for approximately 1305 students from early learning to Year 12, including 276 boarders from Years 7 to 12.

The school is affiliated with the Australian Boarding Schools Association (ABSA), the Association of Heads of Independent Schools of Australia (AHISA), the Independent Primary School Heads of Australia (IPSHA), Independent Schools Queensland (ISQ), and has been a member of the Great Public Schools Association of Queensland (GPS) since 1920.

History

The Southport School was established in 1901 by the Revd (later Rt Revd) Horace Dixon. The land was originally owned by Benjamin and Ann Spendelove. The Spendelove family continued to make a contribution to the school, providing boxing coaching for many years.

The first boarding houses (Delpratt, McKinley and Thorold) were established in 1907 and 1908. 

The Southport School has the third oldest school boat club in Queensland, having first started rowing in 1905. This followed Brisbane Grammar School and Ipswich Grammar School first having a rowing contest in 1891.

Headmasters

House system
As with most Australian schools, The Southport School utilises a house system. The Senior School is divided vertically into the twelve houses: eight day boy houses and four boarding houses. The Preparatory School is divided into four houses. The Senior Houses are:

The three original houses – Delpratt, McKinley and Thorold – were founded in 1909, 1909 and 1908, respectively. The inaugural house shield competition was held in 1910, won by MicKinley. The additional day houses were added in the 1970s and 1980s, and the fourth boarding house, Biddle, added in 1988. The most successful house in the House Shield competition has been Thorold House, achieving its 40th House Shield victory in 2014; MicKinley had won 31 house shields and Delpratt 21 as of 2014.

Sport

TSS has a strong sporting tradition and over the years has produced many Australian and international athletes of note. The school currently offers the following activities to its students: basketball, chess, cricket, cross country, debating, soccer, gymnastics, rowing, rugby, swimming, sailing, tennis, and track and field. TSS has been a member of the Great Public Schools' Association Inc (GPS) since 1920. TSS fields soccer teams within the development divisions of Football Queensland South Coast. The school has achieved many sporting premierships during its membership.

GPS Premierships (official GPS records):
 Rowing (21) 1918, 1920, 1921, 1923, 1930, 1931, 1933, 1953, 1954, 1958, 1959, 1970, 1978, 1985, 1986, 1987, 1989, 1991, 2000, 2006, 2018
 Cricket (22) 1920, 1923, 1926, 1927, 1928, 1929, 1970, 1971, 1972, 1973, 1974, 1980, 1981, 1982, 2010, 2011, 2014, 2015, 2017, 2018, 2019, 2021
 Rugby (11) 1922, 1926, 1933, 1938, 2001, 2003, 2006, 2007, 2010, 2017, 2019
 Tennis (9) 1921, 1924, 1926, 1930, 1934, 1956, 2000, 2001, 2018
 Swimming (8) 1922, 2004, 2005, 2007, 2008, 2013, 2015, 2016
 Gymnastics (7) 1935, 1936, 1962, 1963, 2008, 2009, 2010
 Sailing (7) 2002, 2003, 2014, 2015, 2016, 2017, 2018, 2019,2022
 Athletics (5) 1918, 1919, 1922, 1929, 1933
 Football (4) 2012, 2013, 2014, 2020
 Basketball (3) 2009, 2012, 2021 
 Cross Country (1) 1990
 Shooting (4) 1956, 1963, 1967, 1971 (suspended 1974)

Associated Schools Championships:
 Basketball 1980–81 (1979–1986)
 Soccer 1978, 1980, 1981, 1984, 1987, 1988, 1990 (1978–1991)

State Championships 
Basketball (2) 2012, 2021

Notable alumni

The Old Southportonians Association (OSA) is the alumni organisation for Old Boys of the school. The OSA celebrated its 100 years as a recognised body in 2007.

Historic figures also include past choirmaster Henry John King

Student exchange program

The Southport School is a member of Round Square and as such has an extensive network of partner schools with which it performs many student exchanges. TSS is involved in a student exchange program with the Baylor School in Chattanooga, Tennessee, United States; and with Collingwood School in West Vancouver, British Columbia,  Canada.

Pacific Cable Station
The two surviving buildings of the Pacific Cable Station were relocated to the school in 1982 for use as the school's music department. Largely untouched from their original form, they are listed on the Gold Coast Local Heritage Register.

See also

 List of boarding schools in Australia
 List of schools in Queensland
 List of Anglican schools in Australia

References

External links

 The Southport School website

Educational institutions established in 1901
1901 establishments in Australia
Anglican high schools in Queensland
Anglican primary schools in Queensland
Boarding schools in Queensland
Boys' schools in Queensland
Schools on the Gold Coast, Queensland
Southport, Queensland
Great Public Schools Association of Queensland
Junior School Heads Association of Australia Member Schools
Round Square schools
Soccer teams on the Gold Coast, Queensland